In mathematics, and in particular game theory, Sion's minimax theorem is a generalization of John von Neumann's minimax theorem, named after Maurice Sion.

It states:

Let  be a compact convex subset of a linear topological space and  a convex subset of a linear topological space.

then,

See also
Parthasarathy's theorem
Saddle point

References
 
 

Game theory
Mathematical optimization
Mathematical theorems